Station Hill is a town located on the island of Mayreau, which is part of the Grenadines island chain.

See also
 Saint Vincent and the Grenadines

References
Scott, C. R. (ed.) (2005) Insight guide: Caribbean (5th edition). London: Apa Publications.

Populated places in Saint Vincent and the Grenadines